Engine turning, also known as jewelling, is a fine geometric pattern turned onto metal as a finish. Aluminium is often the metal chosen to inscribe, but any appropriate surface can be finely machined to produce intricate repetitive patterns that offer reflective interest and fine detail.

Uses

Aircraft
-style engine turning was used on the sheet metal panels of the engine cowling (nose) of Charles Lindbergh's aircraft, the Spirit of St. Louis.

The sheet metal parts of the World War I Fokker Eindecker fighters aircraft series, especially around the engine cowl and associated sheet metal, are noted for having a "dragged" form of engine turning entirely covering them. The tool creating the "swirls" was repeatedly moved along a short, irregular path each time while pressed against the metal, to create the intricate appearance that was characteristic of the aircraft's sheet-metal parts. It is partly surmised to have been a mechanical method to "clad" a duralumin-alloy sheet-metal panel with a layer of pure aluminum, for corrosion protection.

Automobiles
In the 1920s and 1930s, automobile parts such as valve covers, which are right on top of the engine, were also engine-turned. Similarly, dashboards or the instrument panel of the same were often engine-turned. Customizers also would similarly decorate their vehicles with engine-turned panels.

Documents
Engravings produced by engine turning are often incorporated into the design of bank notes, and other high-value documents, to make counterfeiting difficult. The resulting graphics are called guillochés.

Firearms
Engine turning is also used on various firearm components to prevent corrosion by holding traces of oil and lubricants on the surface, in turn to a polished surface resulting in a smooth operation.

See also
 Guilloché
 
 Rose engine lathe

References

External links
 Engine Turning on YouTube by The Unemployed Prop Guy

Visual motifs
Corrosion prevention